The rivière du Moulin (in English: Mill River) is a tributary of the Bécancour River which flows on the south shore of the St. Lawrence River into the Estuary of Saint Lawrence.

The Rivière du Moulin flows entirely in the municipality of Saint-Louis-de-Blandford, located in the Arthabaska Regional County Municipality, in the administrative region of Centre-du-Québec, in Québec, in Canada.

Geography 

The main hydrographic slopes near the "rivière du Moulin" are:
 north side: Gentilly River, Petite rivière du Chêne;
 east side: Bécancour River;
 south side: Bécancour River;
 west side: Bécancour River, Sauvage River.

The Moulin river takes its source in the locality "La Petite Belgique", in the area south of highway 20, in the municipality of Saint-Louis-de-Blandford.

From its head area, the Moulin river flows over  divided into the following segments:
 southwest, along (on the south side) highway 20, to route 263;
 south, to its confluence.

The Moulin River flows on the north bank of the Bécancour River.

Toponymy 

The toponym "rivière du Moulin" was made official on November 17, 1979, at the Commission de toponymie du Québec.

See also 

 List of rivers of Quebec

References 

Rivers of Centre-du-Québec
Arthabaska Regional County Municipality